Carlo Tavagnutti (born ??, 1929 in Gorizia, Italy) is an Italian photographer who, for over 50 years, has taken pictures of  landscapes and architecture. He specialises in black and white mountain landscapes.

References and notes
Volo con l'aquila (Book), written by Celso Macor with photography by Carlo Tavagnutti (1998)

Published works and compilations
Julische Alpen (1978)
Tricorno 1778-1978 (1978)
Ostliche Dolomiten (1979)
Alpi Giulie Occidentali (1983)
Il Carso Isontino (1984)
Dalla vita di un alpinista (1985)
Le arti a Gorizia nel secondo '900 (1987)
Il mito del paesaggio nella fotografia del Novecentro in Friuli (1988)
Isonzo (1991) 
Giovanni Paolo II in F.V.G. (1992)
Collio (1993)
Sui sentieri del F.V.G. (1997)
II F.V.G e i suoi grandi vini (1997)
Volo con L'aquila (1998)

1929 births
Living people
People from Gorizia
Italian photographers